Davorka Balić (born 7 January 1988 in Osijek, SFR Yugoslavia) is a Croatian female basketball player.

References

External links
Profile at eurobasket.com

1988 births
Living people
Sportspeople from Osijek
Croatian women's basketball players
Croatian Women's Basketball League players
Power forwards (basketball)